Gregg Clark (born 11 January 1971 in Johannesburg) is a field hockey player from South Africa, who was a member of the national squad that finished tenth at the 2004 Summer Olympics in Athens. He was also present at the Atlanta Games in 1996. The midfielder played for Durban, and a provincial team called KwaZulu Natal Raiders.
He is also the most capped South African national hockey player with 250 caps and 42 goals. 

He was appointed head coach of Hockey India League's Ranchi Rhinos for its inaugural 2013 season. In January 2021, he was appointed as the analytical coach of the Indian men's hockey team.

International senior tournaments
 1994 – World Cup, Sydney (10th)
 1996 – Hockey Africa Cup of Nations (1st)
 1995 – All-Africa Games, Harare (1st)
 1996 – Summer Olympics, Atlanta (10th)
 1997 – World Cup Qualifier, Kuala Lumpur (9th)
 1998 – Commonwealth Games, Kuala Lumpur (no ranking)
 1999 – All-Africa Games, Johannesburg (1st)
 2000 – Hockey Africa Cup of Nations (1st)
 2001 – Champions Challenge, Kuala Lumpur (2nd)
 2002 – World Cup, Kuala Lumpur (13th)
 2002 – Commonwealth Games, Manchester (4th)
 2003 – All-Africa Games, Abuja (2nd)
 2003 – Champions Challenge, Johannesburg (3rd)
 2004 – Olympic Qualifier, Madrid (7th)
 2004 – Summer Olympics, Athens (10th)

References

External links
 

1971 births
Living people
South African male field hockey players
Male field hockey midfielders
South African field hockey coaches
Olympic field hockey players of South Africa
Field hockey players at the 1996 Summer Olympics
Field hockey players at the 1998 Commonwealth Games
Field hockey players at the 2002 Commonwealth Games
2002 Men's Hockey World Cup players
Field hockey players at the 2004 Summer Olympics
Field hockey players from Johannesburg
South African people of British descent
Commonwealth Games competitors for South Africa
African Games gold medalists for South Africa
Competitors at the 1999 All-Africa Games
Competitors at the 1995 All-Africa Games
Competitors at the 2003 All-Africa Games
African Games medalists in field hockey